Murad Bazarov (born August 6, 1994) is an Azerbaijani wrestler who participated at the 2010 Summer Youth Olympics in Singapore. He won the gold medal for Azerbaijan in the boys' Greco-Roman 42 kg event, defeating Yosvanys Peña of Cuba in the final. In 2012 he won the gold medal at the 2012 World Junior Wrestling Championships in Pattaya, defeating Artur Labazanov of Russia in the final.

References 

Living people
1994 births
Wrestlers at the 2010 Summer Youth Olympics
Azerbaijani male sport wrestlers
Youth Olympic gold medalists for Azerbaijan